William Barber, Bill Barber or Billy Barber may refer to:

Politicians
William Barber (MP for Bedford), Member of Parliament (MP) for Bedford
William Barber (MP for Dunwich), MP for Dunwich
William Barber (Ontario politician) (1808–1887), Canadian businessman and politician
William Alonzo Barber (1843–?), Wisconsin politician, soldier, businessman, banker and educator
William Henry Peter Barber (1857–1943), New Zealand politician

Sports
William Barber (Hambledon cricketer) (1734–1805), English cricketer of the Hambledon Club in the 1760s and 1770s
William Barber (Sheffield cricketer) (1797–?), English cricketer, played for Sheffield 
William Barber (Nottinghamshire cricketer) (1881–1971), English cricketer who played for Nottinghamshire
William Barber (cricketer, born 1906) (1906–1981), English cricketer 
William Barber (cricketer, born 1919) (1919–1989), English cricketer
Bill Barber (born 1952), Canadian ice hockey player
Bill Barber (tennis) (born 1970), American tennis player
Billy Barber (boxer) (1928–2004), Australian boxer

Musicians
Bill Barber (musician) (1920–2007), jazz musician (tuba)
Billy Barber (musician), keyboardist and composer

Others
William Barber II (born 1963), minister and social activist
William Barber (engraver) (1807–1879), Chief Engraver of the United States Mint
Sir William Barber, 1st Baronet (1860–1927), English solicitor, property developer and philanthropist
William E. Barber (1919–2002), United States Marine Corps colonel and Korean War recipient of the Medal of Honor
William Swinden Barber (1832–1908), Gothic Revival and Arts and Crafts architect

See also
William Barbour (disambiguation)